Caraway Speedway is a short track located near Asheboro, North Carolina, U.S. Caraway Speedway was built in 1966 as a dirt track. The track was paved in 1972 and joined the NASCAR Weekly Series family as a .455 mile asphalt short track. Caraway Speedway was owned and operated by Russell and Valastra Hackett from 1977 to 2010. Russell turned over operations to Darren and Renee Hackett for the 2011 season. Caraway Speedway hosts a variety of weekly series, several Whelen Southern Modified Series events, as well as other touring series.

They host Saturday night events at 7:00 pm to allow fans to spend some time with their favorite drivers after the race.

Caraway Speedway hosted 3 NASCAR Busch Series races, from 1982 to 1983, 8 NASCAR Southeast Series events between 1996 and 2005.

The facility also hosted 60 NASCAR Whelen Southern Modified Tour events from the inaugural season in 2005 until the series' last season in 2016.

The track hosted 3 CARS Tour races between 1998 and 2012. The Series returned in 2021.

Records
Track record – George Brunnhoelzl III (15.648 sec. @ 104.678 mph) NASCAR Whelen Southern Modified Tour.

Past Busch Series winners

Late model track champions

See also
 List of NASCAR race tracks
 Whelen All-American Series
 Whelen Southern Modified Tour

External links
Caraway Speedway Official Site
Schedule
Track Champions
Caraway Speedway archive at Racing-Reference

56th season opener schedule

Motorsport venues in North Carolina
NASCAR tracks
Sports venues in Randolph County, North Carolina
1966 establishments in North Carolina
Sports venues completed in 1966